St Michael's Church is one of the oldest Christian (Catholic) churches in the Mahim suburb of Mumbai (Bombay), situated at the junction of LJ Road and Mahim Causeway. Initially known as San Miguel in Portuguese, the original structure was built by Franciscan missionaries of the Indo-Portuguese era, some time around 1534 AD, in what was then Portuguese Bombay. It was rebuilt a number of times; the present structure dates to 1973. From 1739 to 1761, St Michael's also served as a refuge to the popular icon of the Virgin Mary; the icon is now placed at the present-day Basilica of Our Lady of the Mount of Bandra.

The place is colloquially referred to as Mahim Church due to its location. St Michael's is also known for its novenas addressed to our Lady of Perpetual Succour on Wednesdays, which has been frequented by thousands of devotees seeking mannats (blessings).

History 

The original structure at St Michael's is said to have been built in 1534 by António do Porto, a church builder of the Franciscan Order. With the Mahratta Invasion of Bassein and other places like Salsette in 1739, Our Lady of Mount Bandra's chapel was destroyed by the Portuguese at the instance of the British so that its location remained secret to the Maratha (caste). At this time, St Michael's was the refuge place for the statue of the Blessed Virgin from the chapel. The image remained in St Michael's till 1761, when it was moved to its present structure in Bandra.

In 1853, St Michael's Church witnessed a struggle between Bishop Anastasius Hartmann and the padroado order. St Michael's was in control of the vicars apostolic for nearly 60 years. In 1853, a discontented group decided that the control be handed back to the Padroado system. To prevent this, Hartmann - as the vicars' leader - went to the church and declared that "he would rather die a martyr than surrender the church to the schismatics". Hartmann and his followers stayed in the church with enough food and water for 15 days. Hartmann's opponents had laid "siege" to the church during this period, blocking all entrances. On the 15th day, civil authorities intervened and insisted that the church be reopened. Following this, Hartmann lost control of the church, passing it to padroado order.<ref>{{cite book | title=A History of Christianity in India | first=Stephen | last=Neill | pages=290–1 |url=https://books.google.com/books?id=Xi-tvrYbYxMC&q=St.+Michael%27s+Bombay&pg=PA290 | year=2002 | publisher=Cambridge University Press | isbn=0-521-89332-1}}</ref>

In his 1917 book, Sheppard remarks that St Michael's was situated on the Portuguese church street and is one of the four "only known Portuguese buildings; and of these no distinguishing original feature survives, as they were much rebuilt".  The present structure of St. Michaels was rebuilt in 1973.

 Novena 

St. Michael's sees a large number of people on Wednesdays every week, when novena prayers to Our Lady of Perpetual Succour are held throughout the day. These services are attended by people of all faiths. Devotees believe that visiting the Church on nine consecutive Wednesdays (Novena) will grant their wishes. Some of them offer wax figures of what they desire; for example, a wax house. According to Father Hugh Fonseca, around 40-50,000 devotees visit the church every week.

The weekly Novena services were started in 1948, when Father Edward Placidus Fernandes from Bombay noticed a similar ritual celebrating Our Lady of Perpetual Succour'' at Belfast, Northern Ireland, during his visit to Europe. Fr. Fernandes brought with him a picture touched to the original icon at Rome. On 8 September 1948, the Birthday of Mary (concurrent with a Wednesday that year), Fr. Fernandes, as a vicar, held the first Novena services. Initially, only two services were held every Wednesday. But now, from 8:30AM to 10:30PM, thirteen services are held and in various languages: English, Konkani, Marathi, Tamil and Hindi. In 2014, A painting of the Our Lady of Perpetual Succor was gifted to St. Michaels by the Vatican. The painting is an authentic, hand-painted version of the original icon in Rome.

Reported "Bleeding" Christ picture 

On 27 June 2008, thousands of devotees visited St. Michael's to see the picture of Jesus called "the Divine Mercy". The picture showed some red spots which were believed to be blood near the heart of Jesus. The spots were noticed on the day at 08:30PM, on the occasion of the feast of Our Lady of Perpetual Help, and were termed a "miracle" by devotees. Not only Christians, but also Hindus and Muslims from Maharashtra and the neighboring states of Goa, Karnataka, and Gujarat, visited the Church to catch a glimpse of the picture. The queue to entering St. Michael's extended more than a kilometer.

Parish Priest Father Raphael and Father Doneth D'Souza from the St. Michael's church as well as Archbishop cardinal Oswald Gracias declined the miracle claim. Fr. D'Souza explained: "It's not a blood stain and it's also not a miracle. Every image of Divine Mercy has a red halo around the heart and in this case, the red colour has run because of the moisture in the air. It will look like a blood stain, but it's not."

The image was removed and sent to a scientific analysis on the orders of Oswald Gracias. The result of that study was released in the September archdiocesan weekly and it said that the tests "established that there are no traces of blood in the red rays emanating from the Heart of Jesus in this image of Divine Mercy". Monsoon humidity and changes in the air quality were the suspected causes. Oswald Gracias did not explain the exact reasons.

See also 
 Saint Michael: Roman Catholic traditions and views
Weeping Crucifix in Bombay

References

External links 
 YouTube: Mass at St. Michael's
Home | St Michael Church, Mahim

Roman Catholic churches in Mumbai
1534 establishments in the Portuguese Empire